The 2019 Oman Cricket World Cup Challenge League B was the inaugural edition of Group B of the 2019–2022 ICC Cricket World Cup Challenge League, a cricket tournament which formed part of the qualification pathway to the 2023 Cricket World Cup. It took place in Oman, with all the matches having List A status.

Initially, it was scheduled to take place between 25 November and 10 December 2019 in Hong Kong. However, citing the instability in Hong Kong, the first round of matches in League B were moved to Oman. Uganda won the series, after they won all five of their matches.

Squads

Bermuda's vice-captain Rodney Trott was unable to travel to Oman due to an administrative error, after it was discovered that his passport was due to expire within six months. He was replaced in the squad by Coolidge Durham. Initially, when Kenya announced their squad, they did not name their captain. Cricket Kenya then made some changes to the management of the team, also naming Irfan Karim as the captain, replacing Shem Ngoche.

Fixtures

References

External links
 Series home at ESPN Cricinfo

International cricket competitions in 2019–20
International cricket competitions in Oman